C of I may refer to:

 The College of Idaho
 The Church of Ireland
 Certificate of Indebtedness, a non-marketable United States Treasury security